Hempstead is a village and civil parish in the Uttlesford district of Essex, England.

Hempstead is situated on the B1054 Saffron Walden to Steeple Bumpstead road.
The nearest village is Great Sampford,  to the south. The population of the parish at the 2011 census was 451.

The village has one church, St. Andrew's, where William Harvey, who discovered the circulation of blood in the human body, and Sir Eliab Harvey, Captain of the Temeraire at the battle of Trafalgar, are interred.

The notorious highwayman Dick Turpin, was born in the village public house, where his father was landlord. He was baptised in the village church.

Hempstead has a pre-school located in the village hall and a play area on the Glebe which was installed in 2018.

See also
Hempstead Essex

The Hundred Parishes

References

External links
 

Villages in Essex
Uttlesford